The Broadcasting Standards Authority (BSA) is a New Zealand Crown entity created by the Broadcasting Act 1989 to develop and uphold standards of broadcasting for radio, free-to-air and pay television.

The main functions of the BSA are to develop and maintain codified broadcasting standards and to operate a complaints procedure.

The BSA is made up of a board appointed for a fixed term by the Governor-General on the advice of the Minister of Broadcasting, Communications and Digital Media, meaning that practically the Minister of Broadcasting (and Cabinet) appoint the board. The chair is always a barrister. One member is appointed after consultation with broadcasters and one after consultation with public interest groups.

Complaints regarding breaches of broadcasting standards can only be brought to the BSA after first being raised with the broadcaster.

In March 2013, the Law Commission proposed moving complaints about news and current affairs out of the jurisdiction of the BSA, the Press Council, and the Online Media Standards Authority, placing them under a proposed new body, the News Media Standards Authority.

Current members
 Paula Rose
 Leigh Pearson
 Susie Staley (Acting Chair)

References

External links
 BSA Website

New Zealand independent crown entities
Mass media in New Zealand
Mass media complaints authorities
Consumer organisations in New Zealand
Broadcasting authorities
Regulation in New Zealand